Alexander Garbowski (June 25, 1922 – June 27, 2008) was an American professional baseball player. Primarily a shortstop during his nine-year career (1946–1954) in minor league baseball, Garbowski appeared in two Major League games for the 1952 Detroit Tigers as a pinch runner. He was a veteran of the United States Army who served during World War II.

Garbowski was selected from the unaffiliated Seattle Rainiers of the Pacific Coast League in the 1951 Rule 5 draft and made the Tigers' 28-man, early-season roster out of spring training in 1952. In both his pinch running appearances, he substituted for slow-footed Detroit catcher Matt Batts, on April 16 against the St. Louis Browns and on May 9 against the Chicago White Sox. He recorded no runs scored and no stolen bases in those two games. He did not appear as a fielder on either occasion.

He was sent to Detroit's Triple-A Buffalo Bisons affiliate on May 13 when rosters were cut to 25 men. Garbowski appeared in 944 games as a minor leaguer.

References

External links

1922 births
2008 deaths
United States Army personnel of World War II
Baseball players from New York (state)
Buffalo Bisons (minor league) players
Charleston Senators players
Detroit Tigers players
People from Putnam County, New York
Sportspeople from Yonkers, New York
Seattle Rainiers players
Toronto Maple Leafs (International League) players
Utica Blue Sox players
Vandergrift Pioneers players
Nyack Rocklands players